Skirroceras is a Stephanoceratacean (ammonite) genus belonging to the family Stephanoceratidae. These fast-swimming carnivores lived during the Jurassic period, in the Bajocian age.

Selected species
Skirroceras bayleanum  (Oppel, 1857) 
Skirroceras macrum   (von Quenstedt) 
Skirroceras leptogyrale  Buckman

References

External links
  Bajocien14

Jurassic ammonites
Jurassic animals of Africa
Jurassic animals of Europe
Ammonitida genera
Stephanoceratoidea